Jordan Leigh Angeli (born May 31, 1986) is an American former soccer player from Lakewood, Colorado. She last played in 2015 for the Western New York Flash in the National Women's Soccer League after a preseason trade with the Washington Spirit. Known for her versatility, Angeli originally debuted for the Santa Clara University women's soccer team as a defender, was moved to forward for Santa Clara in 2005, and played as a midfielder for the United States U-20 women's national soccer team at the 2006 FIFA U-20 Women's World Championship. She is currently a television analyst for the Columbus Crew.

Early life
Born in Englewood, Colorado, Angeli attended Green Mountain High School in Lakewood. In 2003, she was named Soccer America Player of the Month and earned 2003 All-Jeffco first team honors as well as an All-State honorable mention. The following year she was named the 2004 Gatorade Colorado High School Girls Soccer Player of the Year, 2004 Colorado 5A All-State player, and was a 2004 McDonald's All-American. During Angeli's high school career, the team won league championships in 2002 and 2004.

Angeli played for the Colorado Rush in the W-League and led the team to the 2001 under-15 National Championship. Her team also won the regional tournament in 2004.

Playing career

Club

Boston Breakers, 2010–2012
Angeli was selected by the Boston Breakers in the second round (16th pick overall) of the 2010 WPS Draft. During the 2010 WPS season, she was on the starting lineup in 17 of the 22 games in which she played. She scored seven goals in her 1,576 minutes on the pitch helping the Breakers place second during the regular season with a 10–6–8 record. The Breakers advanced to the playoffs but were defeated during the semi-final match by the Philadelphia Independence.

Angeli returned to the Breakers for the 2011 WPS season. During the team's first season game against the Atlanta Beat, she suffered a season-ending ACL injury. In her 29 minutes played during the season, she scored one goal helping the Breakers defeat the Beat 4–1.

Washington Spirit, 2013–2014
In 2013, Angeli was selected by the Washington Spirit in the 2013 NWSL Supplemental Draft. Still recovering from knee surgery, she did not play for the Spirit during the 2013 season.

Western New York Flash, 2015
Following the 2014 NWSL season, the Spirit traded Angeli and a first-round pick—sixth overall—in the 2015 NWSL College Draft to the Western New York Flash for Angela Salem and Katherine Reynolds. The first-round pick later became Lynn Williams.

Angeli announced her retirement from playing soccer in June 2016.

References

External links
 
 
 Santa Clara player page
 

1986 births
Living people
American women's soccer players
Santa Clara Broncos women's soccer players
Boston Breakers players
Women's Professional Soccer players
National Women's Soccer League players
Washington Spirit players
People from Englewood, Colorado
Soccer players from Colorado
Women's association football utility players
Women's association football midfielders
Women's association football forwards
Women's association football defenders
Western New York Flash players
United States women's under-20 international soccer players